The Guangdong National Language Regulations is a set of laws enacted by the Guangdong provincial government in the People's Republic of China in 2012 to promote the use of Standard Mandarin Chinese in broadcast and print media at the expense of the local Chinese varieties of Cantonese, Hakka and Teochew. It has also been labelled a "pro-Mandarin, anti-Cantonese" legislation. The law was signed and came into effect on 1 March 2012.

Ban
The regulations require the entire Guangdong province to broadcast in Pǔtōnghuà Mandarin. Dialect programs and channels can be broadcast if approved by the national or provincial government. In addition, signs of service stores are to be written in simplified Chinese except when in historical sites, pre-registered logos and other exceptions or as approved by state.

Guangdong Governor Zhu Xiaodan signed and set the date of the law to take effect on 1 March 2012.  The requirement forces all government workers, teachers, conference holders, broadcasters, and TV staff to use Mandarin only. All state-run items involving brands, seals, documents, websites, signs, and trade names are not to use Traditional Chinese characters or Variant Chinese characters.  People who do not follow the law will be punished accordingly, as the new law is mandatory.

Responses
The signing has triggered massive negative responses in Guangzhou, Hong Kong and Macau. There were talks of raising movements.  The law is said to have effects equal to the elimination of the autochthonous  Cantonese culture.  
On 24 December, the Guangdong government held a press conference stating that the regulation does not in fact ban Cantonese; one official stating that such a ban will never occur. Currently, the Guangdong province has two channels approved to broadcast mainly in Cantonese, while various other channels and radio stations have dialect programs.

See also
 Chinese unification
 Cultural Revolution
 Debate on traditional and simplified Chinese characters
 Five Races Under One Union
 Han Chinese subgroups
 Protection of the Varieties of Chinese
 Socialist Harmonious Society

References

Cantonese language
Language policy
2012 in China
2012 controversies
History of Guangdong